The England cricket team toured Australia between November 2017 and February 2018 to play five Tests and five One Day Internationals (ODIs). They also played in a three nation Twenty20 International (T20I) tournament, along with New Zealand, who co-hosted the tournament along with Australia. England additionally played two first-class matches, a two-day tour match and a one-day tour match against Cricket Australia XI, as well as a Twenty20 against the Prime Minister's XI. The Test matches made up the 2017–18 Ashes series, with Australia regaining the Ashes by winning the series 4–0. England won the ODI series 4–1. This was England's first bilateral ODI series win in Australia.

In May 2017, it was confirmed that the WACA Ground would host the Test in Perth, as the planned new Perth Stadium would not be opened in time. However, the fifth ODI was played at the new stadium.

Squads

In September 2017, Ben Stokes was named in the initial England squad, but was subsequently ruled out of international selection pending a disciplinary process. The following month, he was replaced by Steven Finn. However, Finn was then himself ruled out of the tour, injuring his knee before the first warm-up game. Tom Curran was called up to replace him. James Anderson was named as England's vice-captain for the Test series in Stokes' absence. George Garton was added to England's squad as cover for Jake Ball during the warm-up games, but returned to the England Lions when Ball recovered in time for the first Test. Additionally, England played a warm-up game during the tour which featured six players not included in the Test squad (Ben Duckett, Keaton Jennings, Daniel Lawrence, Jack Leach, Liam Livingstone, and Mark Wood), although Duckett himself was replaced by Joe Clarke after an off-field incident with James Anderson.

Australia delayed the naming of its squad for the first two Tests until 17 November 2017, and selected Cameron Bancroft to replace Matthew Renshaw. Tim Paine returned to the team after a seven-year absence, ahead of Matthew Wade and Peter Nevill. Ahead of the first Test, Glenn Maxwell was added to Australia's squad as a cover for David Warner, who injured his neck at training. Mitchell Marsh was added to Australia's squad ahead of the third Test, replacing Chadd Sayers.

Australia's Mitchell Starc and England's Craig Overton were ruled out of the fourth Test due to heel and rib injuries respectively. Despite already having lost the Ashes, England opted not to make wholesale changes to their team, announcing prior to the start of the fourth Test match, that Surrey's Tom Curran would make his debut as a replacement for Overton. Ahead of the fifth Test, Ashton Agar was added to Australia's squad. England's Chris Woakes was ruled out of the fifth Test due to injury.

Prior to the ODI series, Dawid Malan was added to England's squad, replacing Ben Stokes. Cameron White was called up to replace Chris Lynn in Australia’s ODI squad after Lynn was ruled out with an injury. Australia's Josh Hazlewood was ruled out of the second ODI due to virus. Alex Carey was added to Australia's ODI squad as cover for Tim Paine. Glenn Maxwell was added to Australia's ODI squad as a cover for Aaron Finch before the fourth ODI. England's Liam Plunkett was ruled out of last two ODIs due to injury.

Tour matches

Western Australia XI vs England

Cricket Australia XI vs England

Cricket Australia XI vs England

Cricket Australia XI vs England

Test series

1st Test

2nd Test

3rd Test

4th Test

5th Test

50-over tour match

Cricket Australia XI vs England

ODI series

1st ODI

2nd ODI

3rd ODI

4th ODI

5th ODI

T20I series

References

External links
 Series home at ESPN Cricinfo

2017 in Australian cricket
2017 in English cricket
England 2017-18
International cricket competitions in 2017–18
2017-18
2017-18